This list exhibits the National Basketball Association's top single-season scoring averages based on at least 70 games played or 1400 points scored. The NBA began recording 3-point field goals during the 1979–80 NBA season.

See also
National Basketball Association

References

External links
Basketball-Reference.com

National Basketball Association top individual scoring season averages
National Basketball Association statistical leaders